Skoryky is a village in Bohodukhiv Raion, Kharkiv Oblast, Ukraine. It belongs to Zolochiv settlement hromada, one of the hromadas of Ukraine. The population is 98 people.

Until 18 July 2020, Skoryky belonged to Zolochiv Raion. The raion was abolished in July 2020 as part of the administrative reform of Ukraine, which reduced the number of raions of Kharkiv Oblast to seven. The area of Zolochiv Raion was merged into Bohodukhiv Raion.

Geography 

References 

Villages in Bohodukhiv Raion